Joseph O'Neill is an Irish novelist and non-fiction writer. O'Neill's novel Netherland was awarded the 2009 PEN/Faulkner Award for Fiction and the Kerry Group Irish Fiction Award.

Early life
Joseph O'Neill was born in Cork, Ireland, on 23 February 1964. He is of half-Irish and half-Turkish ancestry.

O'Neill's parents moved around much in O'Neill's youth: O'Neill spent time in Mozambique as a toddler and in Turkey until the age of four, and he also lived in Iran. From the age of six, O'Neill lived in the Netherlands, where he attended the Lycée français de La Haye and the British School in the Netherlands.  He read law at Girton College, Cambridge, preferring it over English because "literature was too precious" and he wanted it to remain a hobby. O'Neill started off his literary career in poetry but had turned away from it by the age of 24. After being called to the English Bar in 1987, he spent a year writing his first novel.  O'Neill then entered full-time practice as a barrister in London, principally in the field of business law. Since 1998 he has lived in New York City.

Career

Writing
O'Neill is the author of four novels. Netherland was published in May 2008 and was featured on the cover of the New York Times Book Review, where it was called "the wittiest, angriest, most exacting and most desolate work of fiction we've yet had about life in New York and London after the World Trade Center fell". It was also included in The New York Times list of the 10 Best Books of 2008. Literary critic James Wood called it "one of the most remarkable postcolonial books I have ever read". In an interview with the BBC in June 2009, US President Barack Obama revealed that he was reading it, describing it as "an excellent novel."

Among the books on the longlist, it was the favourite to win the Man Booker Prize. However, on 9 September 2008, the Booker nominee shortlist was announced, and the novel failed to make the list. The book received the 2009 PEN/Faulkner Award for Fiction and the 2009 Kerry Group Irish Fiction Award.

He is also the author of a collection of short stories, Good Trouble (2018) and a non-fiction book, Blood-Dark Track: A Family History, which was a New York Times Notable Book for 2002 and a book of the year for the Economist and the Irish Times.

His latest novel, The Dog, released in September 2014,  was longlisted for the Man Booker Prize for Fiction  and named a Notable Book of 2014 by The New York Times.

His short stories have appeared in the New Yorker and in Harper's magazine. Others have been anthologized in:

New Irish Short Stories (ed. Joseph O'Connor) (Faber & Faber) (2011)
Faber Book of Best New Irish Short Stories (ed. David Marcus) (Faber & Faber) (2007)
Dislocation: Stories from a New Ireland (ed. Caroline Walsh) (Carroll & Graf) (2003)
Phoenix Irish Short Stories (ed. David Marcus) (Phoenix) (1999)

In 2019, O'Neill began to publish political essays in the New York Review of Books. He has also written literary and cultural criticism, notably for The Atlantic Monthly.

Teaching
He is the distinguished visiting professor of written arts at Bard College.

Personal life
O'Neill speaks English, French and Dutch. He played club cricket in the Netherlands and the UK, and has played for many years at the Staten Island Cricket Club, much like his Netherland protagonist Hans. His love of cricket continues and he is an active player. In an interview with The Paris Review in 2014 O'Neill said, explaining his interest in writing about Dubai in The Dog, "I’ve moved around so much and lived in so many different places that I don’t really belong to a particular place, and so I have little option but to seek out dramatic situations that I might have a chance of understanding."

Bibliography

Novels
This Is the Life (Faber & Faber; Farrar Straus & Giroux) (1991)
The Breezes (Faber & Faber) (1996)
Netherland (Pantheon; Fourth Estate) (2008)
The Dog (Pantheon; Fourth Estate) (2014)

Short fiction 
Collections
Good Trouble (2018) 
Stories

"Pardon Edward Snowden" The New Yorker, 12 December 2016<ref>O'Neill, Joseph, "Pardon Edward Snowden", The New Yorker, 5 December 2016.</ref>
"The Trusted Traveler" Harper's, 20 May 2016

Non-fiction
The Ascent of Man (Granta, issue 72, Winter 2000)Blood-Dark Track: A Family History (Granta Books) (2001)

Book reviews

References

External links
"The Dubai Gesture", by John Banville, The New York Review of Books, 19 March 2015.  Review of The Dog. 
 "Post 9/11, a New York of Gatsby-Size Dreams and Loss", by Michiko Kakutani, The New York Times, 16 May 2008. Review of Netherland.
 "Pen in One Hand, Cricket Bat in the Other", by Charles McGrath, The New York Times, 17 May 2008. Article on O'Neill.
 "What Did You Do in the War?", by Colin Harrison, The New York Times, 17 February 2002. Review of Blood-Dark Track''.
Archive of Atlantic writings
Archive of pieces for New York magazine
Archive of pieces for The New York Times

Living people
1964 births
20th-century Irish people
21st-century Irish people
Alumni of Girton College, Cambridge
The Atlantic (magazine) people
Irish literary critics
Irish male novelists
Irish male poets
Irish novelists
Irish people of Turkish descent
Irish poets
PEN/Faulkner Award for Fiction winners
Writers from Cork (city)
The New Yorker people